Bofarnel is a hamlet in Cornwall, England, in the United Kingdom. It lies within the civil parish of St Winnow, 6 miles (6.4 km) southeast of Bodmin and 2.5 miles (4 km) north of Lostwithiel. Bodmin Parkway railway station is 1 km to the north of the hamlet.

References

External links

Hamlets in Cornwall